The Society for Political Methodology (SPM) is a learned society focused on quantitative methods in political science, and an organized section of the American Political Science Association. Founded in 1983, it publishes the peer-reviewed journal Political Analysis via Cambridge University Press. The society annually awards the John T. Williams Dissertation Prize for the best dissertation proposal in the area of political methodology.

Presidents

 1983–1985: Christopher H. Achen
 1985–1987: John E. Jackson
 1987–1989: Stanley Feldman
 1989–1991: John R. Freeman
 1991–1993: Henry E. Brady
 1993–1995: Larry Bartels
 1995–1997: James Stimson
 1997–1999: Gary King
 1999–2001: Charles Franklin
 2001–2003: Jonathan Nagler
 2003–2005: Simon Jackman
 2005–2007: Janet M. Box-Steffensmeier
 2007–2009: Philip A. Schrodt
 2009–2011: Jeff Gill
 2011–2013: Robert Franzese
 2013–2015: Kevin Quinn
 2015–2017: Jeffrey Lewis
 2017–2019: Kosuke Imai
 2019–present: Suzanna Linn

References

External links
 

1983 establishments in the United States
Learned societies of the United States
Organizations established in 1983
Political science organizations